El Vado Dam impounds the Rio Chama in the U.S. state of New Mexico, about  north-northwest of New Mexico's largest city, Albuquerque and about  northwest of the capital city of Santa Fe. The earth-filled structure forms El Vado Lake, a storage reservoir for the Middle Rio Grande Project, and has been designated as a New Mexico Historic Civil Engineering Landmark by the American Society of Civil Engineers.

Construction

The El Vado dam was originally built by the Middle Rio Grande Conservancy District as a storage facility for irrigation water to be used in the Middle Rio Grande Basin.
Construction began in 1933 and the dam was completed in 1935. 
Impoundment of the reservoir, which filled by 1936, inundated El Vado, the largest town of Rio Arriba County. The town's name meant "the crossing" in Spanish, and it was named so because it was an important ford and trading center on the Rio Chama during the 19th century.

The dam was rehabilitated by the Bureau of Reclamation in 1954-1955.
In the 1960s and 1970s, the San Juan-Chama Project built a diversion through a tunnel from the San Juan River basin to the Rio Chama, requiring an extensive retrofit of the dam's water conveyance facilities.
The outlet works at El Vado Dam were enlarged between 1965 and 1966 so that releases from the Heron Dam could pass unimpeded through the dam.

Structure

It has a concrete lined spillway capable of discharging  of water. The dam also has a set of outlet works, capable of carrying .

Usage

Owned by the United States Bureau of Reclamation, the El Vado dam serves for storage and flood-control purposes.
It incorporates an 8 megawatt power generation facility owned by the Incorporated County of Los Alamos Department of Public Utilities.
El Vado Lake, the reservoir formed by the dam, has  and is surrounded by El Vado Lake State Park. The lake is a popular location for swimming, fishing and recreational boating.

References

Dams in New Mexico
Buildings and structures in Rio Arriba County, New Mexico
United States Bureau of Reclamation dams
Dams completed in 1935
Dams in the Rio Grande basin
1935 establishments in New Mexico